Usha Parinayam was a film adaptation of the play  Usha Parinayam. It was made by  Kadaru Nagabhushanam under Rajarajeswari films. It starred Tadepalli Lakshmi Kanta Rao as Anirudha, S. V. Ranga Rao as Banasura and Jamuna as Lady Usha. Rajanala Kaleswara Rao, Kannamba, Mukkamala, Relangi and Peketi Sivaram played the other main roles.

Cast
 Tadepalli Lakshmi Kanta Rao as Anirudha
 S. V. Ranga Rao as Banasura
 Kannamba as wife of Banasura
 Jamuna as Lady Usha
 P. Suribabu as Narada
 Suryakala as Chitralekha
 Rajanala Kaleswara Rao as Lord Shiva
 Kalyanam Raghuramaiah as Lord Krishna
 Relangi as Kolahalam
 Mukkamala Krishna Murthy as Rajaguru
 Mikkilineni as Indra

Soundtrack
There are 18 songs and poems in the film.
 "Aathadu Vishnumurthy Paramatmudu" (Padyam) (Singer: P. Suribabu)
 "Andhaalu Chindeti Ee Vanaseemalo" (Singer: K. Jamuna Rani group)
 "Bana Nandhana Ushabala (Padyam)" (Singer: P. Suribabu)
 "Bhakthi Paasambu" - S. Hanumantha Rao 
 "Brathikee Phalambemi Ekakinai Itupai" (Singers: P. B. Srinivas and K. Jamuna Rani)
 "Devaa Hara Hara... Jaya Mahadeva Shambo" (Singers: Madhavapeddi Satyam, P. Leela and others)
 "Karuna Rasabharitha" - P. Leela
 "Madhukaita" (Padyam) - S. Hanumantha Rao 
 "Mana Prema Gaatha" (Lyricist: Sadasiva Brahmam; Singers: Ghantasala and P. Leela)
 "Naakun Muddu" - S. Hanumantha Rao 
 "Ninne Valachithinoi" - K. Rani
 "Nyayamidena Chanduruda" (Lyricist: Samudrala; Singer: P. Susheela)
 "O Javaraala (Adhigo Mana Prema)" - P. B. Sreenivas, K. Jamuna Rani
 "Ottesuko Ottesuko" (Lyricist: Sadasiva Brahmam; Singers: Pithapuram Nageswara Rao and K. Jamuna Rani)
 "Saraseejadhalanayana" (Lyricist: Sadasiva Brahmam; Singer: Kalyanam Raghuramaiah)
 "Subhodayamuna" - K. Jamuna Rani 
 "Suralu Munivarulaina" - Kalyanam Raghuramayya 
 "Vande Sambhum and Dandakum" - Madhavapeddi Sathyam

References

1960s Telugu-language films
1961 films
Indian black-and-white films
Films based on the Bhagavata Purana
Films scored by S. Hanumantha Rao